Bhavani is a Hindu goddess, a ferocious aspect of Parvati.

Bhavani may also refer to:

People
 Adoor Bhavani, Indian film actress.
 Bhavani (actress), Indian film actress.

Places
 Bhavani, Tamil Nadu, a city in Erode District, Tamil Nadu, India
 Bhavani River, a major tributary of Kaveri River in Tamil Nadu
 Bhavanisagar, a panchayat town on the banks of Bhavanisagar Dam in Erode District
 Bhavanisagar Dam, a dam and reservoir on Bhavani River in Erode District

Movies
 Bhavani (1967 film), a Tamil-language film
 Bhavani (2011 film), a Tamil-language film